Dantrell Davis (July 31, 1985 – October 13, 1992) was a 7-year-old boy from Chicago, Illinois, who was murdered in October 1992. Davis was walking to school with his mother in the Cabrini-Green housing projects when he was accidentally shot by Anthony Garrett, a member of a local street gang who intended to shoot a rival. Dantrell's death sparked an increased awareness of the extensive violence occurring in Chicago's inner-city projects, and led to the first street gang truce in Cabrini–Green, which lasted for three years. Garrett was convicted of first-degree murder for Davis' death, and received a 100-year sentence.

Murder 
Shortly after 9:00a.m. on the morning of October 13, 1992, 7-year-old Dantrell Davis was walking with his mother Annette Freeman to Jenner Elementary School where he was a first grader, from his home at 1117–19 (500 West Oak) N.Cleveland Ave, a 17–story high-rise belonging to the Chicago Housing Authority in the Cabrini-Green housing project in Chicago's Near North Side. While walking to school, Davis was struck by a bullet fired by Anthony Garrett, who was perched in a 10th-floor apartment in the nearby 1157–59 N Cleveland Avenue high-rise building, and was pronounced dead at Children's Memorial Hospital. Garrett was arrested only hours after he shot Davis, and the following day signed a -page confession stating that he was aiming to kill rival gang members when he accidentally shot Davis as he walked past his target. Garrett was indicted on first degree murder charges on November 5, 1992, and sentenced to 100 years in prison on March 8, 1994.

Aftermath 
The murder of Davis gained national attention, and brought an increasing awareness to the street violence that was rampant in Chicago's inner-city housing projects. The reputation of Cabrini-Green worsened further, which had already become synonymous with the problems associated with public housing in the United States. Davis' death was one of several events that contributed to Cabrini-Green's gradual demolition and redevelopment of Cabrini-Green beginning in the late 1990s.

On March5, 1993, the section of N Cleveland Avenue between WOak Street and WHobie Street, where Davis had been killed, was given the honorary name Dantrell Davis Way. The honorary street sign still remains, although much of the Cabrini–Green housing project, including Davis' home and the building he was shot from, have since been demolished. Derek Ault, a teacher at Jenner Elementary School, started the Dantrell Davis Peace Party.

See also 
 History of African Americans in Chicago

References

External links 

1985 births
1992 deaths
1992 murders in the United States
People from Chicago
Murdered American children
People murdered in Illinois
Deaths by firearm in Illinois
Murdered African-American people
Male murder victims
Incidents of violence against boys